Wang Shitai (March 17, 1910 – March 14, 2008) was a People's Republic of China politician. He was born in Luochuan County, Shaanxi Province. He was governor of Gansu Province, Chairman of the Gansu People's Congress and twice CPPCC Committee Chairman of Gansu. He was a delegate to the 1st National People's Congress (1954–1959), 5th National People's Congress (1978–1983) and 6th National People's Congress (1983–1988).

References
原中共中央顾问委员会委员王世泰同志逝世

1910 births
2008 deaths
Alternate members of the 8th Central Committee of the Chinese Communist Party
Chinese Communist Party politicians from Shaanxi
Delegates to the 7th National Congress of the Chinese Communist Party
Delegates to the 1st National People's Congress
Delegates to the 5th National People's Congress
Delegates to the 6th National People's Congress
Governors of Gansu
Members of the 11th Central Committee of the Chinese Communist Party
Members of the Central Advisory Commission
Members of the Standing Committee of the 2nd National People's Congress
Members of the Standing Committee of the 3rd National People's Congress
Members of the Standing Committee of the 4th National People's Congress
People's Republic of China politicians from Shaanxi